Touring Talkies is a 2013 Indian Marathi-language film directed by Gajendra Ahire and produced by Trupti Bhoir, starring Subodh Bhave, Trupti Bhoir and Neha Pendse.

Plot 
The film is based on the concept of roaming cinema which was one of the oldest traditions in the bygone era of Indian cinema where the movies were showcased in tents for the local folks also known as Touring talkies. For the past few decades these films have made a common recurring occurrences in most of the Carnival Fun fair taking place across villages where the Marathi Cinema is adored in a completely distinctive fashion

Cast 
 Trupti Bhoir as Chaandi
 Subodh Bhave
 Milind Shinde as antagonist
 Kishor Kadam
 Suhas Palshikar
 Vaibhav Mangle
 Chinmay Sant
 Neha Pendse

Music 
The songs of the film are composed by Ilaiyaraaja.
"Title Song" - N/A
"Theme"

Reception 
Boyd van Hoeij of The Hollywood Reporter wrote, "This broadly played crowd-pleaser pits a no-nonsense female projectionist against an art house director in rural India".

References

External links 
 

2010s Marathi-language films
Indian drama films
Films about films
Films scored by Ilaiyaraaja
Films directed by Gajendra Ahire
2013 drama films
2013 films